Isopogon heterophyllus is a plant in the family Proteaceae and is endemic to the southwest of Western Australia. It is a shrub with simple or pinnate, cylindrical leaves and hairy, usually pink flowers.

Description

Taxonomy and naming
Isopogon heterophyllus was first formally described in 1845 by Carl Meissner in Johann Georg Christian Lehmann's book Plantae Preissianae.

In 2017, Rye and Hislop proposed that I. heteropyllus is a synonym of Isopogon formosus subsp. formosus but their claim has not been assessed by the Australian Plant Census as at November 2020.

Distribution and habitat
This isopogon grows in open woodland and shrubland and is common and widespread between Cranbrook, Albany, the Stirling Range National Park and Esperance.

References

heterophyllus
Eudicots of Western Australia
Plants described in 1845
Taxa named by Carl Meissner